The 2002 FIFA World Cup qualification UEFA Group 2 was a UEFA qualifying group for the 2002 FIFA World Cup. The group comprised Andorra, Cyprus, Estonia, the Netherlands, Portugal and the Republic of Ireland.

The group was won by Portugal, who qualified for the 2002 FIFA World Cup. The runners-up Republic of Ireland entered the UEFA–AFC play-off as the group's play-off berth was randomly drawn by FIFA for the intercontinental play-off against an AFC team not one from its own confederation. Portugal, Ireland, and the Netherlands were clearly the top sides in the group, each handing out six beatings to the three other minnows. Between the top three, four of the matches were drawn, but the Netherlands lost one match each to Portugal and Ireland and had to settle for third place. In the end, Portugal only topped the group ahead of Ireland by virtue of superior goal difference.

Standings

Matches

Goalscorers

8 goals

 Pauleta

7 goals

 Nuno Gomes

6 goals

 Michalis Konstantinou
 Ruud Van Nistelrooy
 Luís Figo

5 goals

 Patrick Kluivert

4 goals

 Roy Keane
 Sérgio Conceição

3 goals

 Ioannis Okkas
 Andres Oper
 Ian Harte
 Matt Holland
 Jimmy Floyd Hasselbaink
 Clarence Seedorf
 Mark Van Bommel
 Pierre Van Hooijdonk
 João Vieira Pinto

2 goals

 Ildefons Lima
 Marios Agathokleous
 Martin Reim
 Indrek Zelinski
 Richard Dunne
 Kevin Kilbane
 Mark Kinsella
 Jason McAteer
 Marc Overmars
 Pedro Barbosa

1 goal

 Emiliano González Arqués
 Roberto Jonas
 Justo Ruiz
 Marios Christodoulou
 Milenko Špoljarić
 Marko Kristal
 Jevgeni Novikov
 Raio Piiroja
 Gary Breen
 David Connolly
 Robbie Keane
 Gary Kelly
 Niall Quinn
 Phillip Cocu
 Jeffrey Talan
 Giovanni van Bronckhorst
 Boudewijn Zenden
 Rui Jorge
 Manuel Rui Costa
 Ricardo Sá Pinto

1 own goal

 Raio Piiroja (playing against the Netherlands)

External links
FIFA official page
RSSSF - 2002 World Cup Qualification
Allworldcup

2
2000–01 in Republic of Ireland association football
Qual
2000 in Estonian football
2001 in Estonian football
2000–01 in Dutch football
Qual
2000–01 in Portuguese football
qual
2000–01 in Cypriot football
2001–02 in Cypriot football
2000–01 in Andorran football
2001–02 in Andorran football